ISO/IEC 8859-10:1998, Information technology — 8-bit single-byte coded graphic character sets — Part 10: Latin alphabet No. 6, is part of the ISO/IEC 8859 series of ASCII-based standard character encodings, first edition published in 1992. It is informally referred to as Latin-6. It was designed to cover the Nordic languages, deemed of more use for them than ISO 8859-4.

ISO-8859-10 is the IANA preferred charset name for this standard when supplemented with the C0 and C1 control codes from ISO/IEC 6429. Microsoft has assigned code page 28600 a.k.a. Windows-28600 to ISO-8859-10 in Windows. IBM has assigned Code page 919 to ISO-8859-10. It is published by Ecma International as ECMA-144.

Codepage layout
Differences from ISO-8859-1 have the Unicode code point number below the character.

ISO-IR 158 Codepage layout
ISO-IR 158 is a supplementary ISO 2022 graphical set, containing characters which are absent in ISO-8859-10, but which are required for writing Skolt Sami or historic Sami orthographies. It is intended to be used in an ISO 4873 profile for Sami languages, as a G2 or G3 set (i.e. prefixed with 0x8E/ or 0x8F/ respectively) alongside the main Latin-6 (ISO 8859-10) G1 set. ISO-IR-158 and ISO-IR-197 are both referenced in an informative ISO 8859 annex as allowing for a more adequate coverage of the orthography of certain Sámi languages such as Skolt Sámi than ISO-8859-4 or plain ISO-8859-10.

The code chart gives a symbol used in older orthographies to denote an aspirated consonant, usually written as a reversed apostrophe or raised left-half ring, the unusual name of "high ogonek". The table below shows the additional graphical set.

References

External links
ISO/IEC 8859-10:1998
ISO/IEC 8859-10:1998 - 8-bit single-byte coded graphic character sets, Part 10: Latin alphabet No. 6 (draft dated February 12, 1998, published July 15, 1998)
Standard ECMA-144: 8-Bit Single-Byte Coded Character Sets - Latin Alphabet No. 6 3rd edition (December 2000)
ISO-IR 157 Latin Alphabet No. 6, Supplementary Set (September 7, 1992)

ISO/IEC 8859
Computer-related introductions in 1992